Marimar is a Philippine television drama romance series broadcast by GMA Network. The series is based on a 1994 Mexican television series of the same title. Directed by Joyce E. Bernal and Mac Alejandre, it stars Marian Rivera in the title role and Dingdong Dantes. It premiered on August 13, 2007 on the network's Telebabad line up. The series concluded on March 14, 2008 with a total of 155 episodes.

The series was released on DVD by GMA Records.

Cast and characters

Lead cast
 Marian Rivera as Marimar Perez-Santibañez / Bella Aldama
 Dingdong Dantes as Sergio Santibañez

Supporting cast
 Katrina Halili as Angelika Santibañez / Angelika Aldama
 Richard Gomez as Renato Santibañez
 Jestoni Alarcon as Gustavo Aldama
 Rita Avila as Lupita Aldama
 Boboy Garovillo as Padre Porres
 Leo Martinez as Pancho Perez
 Caridad Sanchez as Cruz Perez
 Bing Loyzaga as Esperanza Aldama
 Michael V. as Fulgoso's voice
 Nigel as Fulgoso
 Manilyn Reynes as Corazon
 Gabby Eigenmann as Nicandro Mejia
 Sheena Halili as Monica
 Bianca King as Natalia Montenegro
 Marky Lopez as Arturo
 Rufa Mae Quinto as Fifi's voice
 Nadine Samonte as Innocencia Arcega
 Mike Tan as Choi
 Mel Kimura as Perfecta

Recurring cast
 Arthur Solinap as Diego
 Marvin Agustin as Rodolfo San Jinez
 Francheska Salcedo as Cruzita Aldama–Santibañez
 Dino Guevarra as Antonio
 Carmina Villaroel as Rhia Concepcion
 Lani Mercado as Vanessa Mae Cruz
 Hayden Kho, Jr. as Hayden Miranda 
 Paolo Paraiso as Carlitos Solis
 Shermaine Santiago as Brenda
 Victor Aliwalas as Adrian Alasco
 K Brosas as Rowena
 Pocholo Montes as Vitug
 Raquel Montessa as Leonor Arcega
 Joseph Ison as Rodrigo
 Mike Gayoso as Angelika's bodyguard

Guest cast
 Jaime Fabregas as Augusto Aldama 
 Pilar Pilapil as Dolores Aldama 
 Cristine Reyes as Kim Chan
 Irma Adlawan as Selva
 Soliman Cruz as Berto
 Bruno Folster as Bruno
 Gwen Garci as Olga
 Ailyn Luna as Cecilla
 Jan Marini as a DSWD officer
 Kirby de Jesus as a mental hospital patient
 Joanne Quintas as Jemma
 Ronnie Lazaro as Jose
 Nicole Dulalia as young Angelika
 Ella Cruz as young Marimar

Overview 

Marimar was a Mexican TV telenovela that was first aired in 1994 on Televisa with singer-actress Thalía in the title role. The series had 75 forty-five-minute episodes, and is the second part of a "Maria" trilogy. The first was Maria Mercedes, and the final was Maria la del Barrio.

Casting
The contract with Televisa for the rights stipulates that GMA Network should start the series in 2007. It was originally offered to Angel Locsin, as a follow-up to the big-budgeted action series Asian Treasures with Robin Padilla. However, Locsin rejected the offer. The network was prompted to give auditions to their roster of young actresses for the role. On March 13, 2008, a video of the fifteen actresses who auditioned for the role of Marimar leaked on YouTube. These actresses are Bianca King, Nadine Samonte, Jennylyn Mercado, Ryza Cenon, Jewel Mische, LJ Reyes, Rhian Ramos, Camille Prats, Pauleen Luna, Katrina Halili, Valerie Concepcion, Nancy Castiglione, Cheska Garcia and Karylle.

The role eventually went to Marian Rivera, who beat her closest rival for the role, Jennylyn Mercado. Some actresses who took part in the audition also landed major and supporting roles in the series. The antagonist role of Angelika Santibanez went first to Bing Loyzaga but was replaced by Katrina Halili.  Her character Ashley was killed off from Lupin which would replace it, so the role of Esperanza went to Bing Loyzaga instead. The role of Natalia and Inocencia went to Bianca King and Nadine Samonte respectively.

Farewell special
A farewell special, "Marimar: Isang Pasasalamat" aired on March 9, 2008. The special got a 52.9% rating in Mega Manila which is the  highest for that date according to AGB-Nielsen. It rated a higher 38.1% in the March 2008 ranking of AGB Nielsen's Nationwide Urban Television Audience Measurement.

Ratings
According to AGB Nielsen Philippines' Mega Manila household television ratings, the pilot episode of Marimar earned a 36.6% rating. While the final episode scored a 52.6% rating which is the series' highest rating.

Accolades

References

External links
 

2007 Philippine television series debuts
2008 Philippine television series endings
Filipino-language television shows
GMA Network drama series
Philippine romance television series
Philippine television series based on Mexican television series
Philippine television series based on telenovelas
Television shows set in the Philippines